Sarah Dodson-Robinson is an American astronomer.

Early life and education
She was born in Los Angeles, California. She goes by the name “Sally.” Dodson-Robinson always had an interest for Space Science. When she was 7 or 8 years old, she joined The Planetary Society and collected the mini-posters of planets and moons that came with the magazine. When she was 10–11 years old, she lived near Austin, Texas for 18 months. At first, Dodson-Robinson was inspired to become an astronomer by Stephen Hawking. She was later further influenced by her undergraduate and graduate advisors, Elliott Horch and Greg Laughlin.

In 2002, Dodson-Robinson received her B.S. at Rochester Institute of Technology. In 2005 she received her M.S. at the University of California, Santa Cruz. In June 2008, she received her Ph.D. in Astronomy and Astrophysics at the University of California.

Career
Dodson-Robinson mainly conducts research in the areas of planet formation and planetary archaeology but also researches more traditional astronomy topics such as protostellar disk chemistry, galactic chemical evolution, and brown dwarfs. With the use of analytical theory and numerical simulations of the dynamical and chemical environment of planet growth, she is able to uncover the formation histories of exoplanets and Solar System objects. In 2010 Dodson-Robinson published “The formation of Uranus and Neptune in solid-rich feeding zones: Connecting chemistry and dynamics” in Icarus. Dodson-Robinson is married and has one child. Dodson-Robinson was previously employed at the University of Texas as an assistant professor. In Spring 2014, Dr. Dodson-Robinson began teaching at The University of Delaware.

Awards and honors
Dodson-Robinson has received multiple honors and awards for her work and research.  When she was still working at the University of Texas, she was honored as a Charter Member into the Society for Teaching Excellence. In 2013, she received the Annie Jump Cannon Award in Astronomy from the American Astronomical Society.  She also received the National Science Foundation’s CAREER Award for her work titled “Giant Planets in Dusty Disks.”

Dodson-Robinson also has other honors including:
Spitzer Fellowship, September 2008-September 2009
Academic Rewards for College Scientists Fellowship
Fellowship term September 2007-June 2008
UC Santa Cruz Teaching Fellow, Summer 2007
National Science Foundation Graduate Research Fellowship
Fellowship term September 2003-June 2006
RIT College of Science Valedictorian, May 2002
RIT College of Science Outstanding Scholar Award, 2002

References

External links
 The Department of Physics and Astronomy Welcomes Dr. Sarah Dodson-Robinson | University of Delaware Dept. of Physics & Astronomy
 Solar System Exploration: People: Archive: Sarah "Sally" Dodson-Robinson
 Women in Planetary Science: Meet Sally Dodson-Robinson
 UT Astronomy - Faculty

Living people
American women astronomers
Rochester Institute of Technology alumni
University of California, Santa Cruz alumni
Recipients of the Annie J. Cannon Award in Astronomy
Year of birth missing (living people)
Planetary scientists
Women planetary scientists